Bonnie May is a lost silent 1920 American comedy-drama film based on the 1916 novel by Louis Dodge. It was directed by Ida May Park and Joseph De Grasse and starred Bessie Love. It was produced by Andrew J. Callaghan Productions and distributed by Federated Film Exchanges of America, Inc.

Plot 
An orphaned girl (Love) grows up in the theater. She becomes smarter and stronger, and never loses her optimism.

Cast 
 Bessie Love
 Charles Gordon
 William Herbert Bainbridge
 Lon Poff
 Miss DuPont

Release 
As this was Bessie Love's first film with Film Exchanges of America, Inc., it was very heavily promoted. A thirty-eight page press book was created, as well as special souvenir mirrors.

On its release, it was shown with The Son of Tarzan; Mystic Mush, a Hank Mann comedy; and a Mutt and Jeff cartoon.

After its release, producer Andrew J. Callaghan sued Federated Film Exchanges, saying that the distributor had not paid the full amount to distribute this film, The Midlanders, and Penny of Top Hill Trail.

Reception 
The film received positive reviews. Author Louis Dodge, who wrote the novel on which the film is based, highly praised Love's performance.

References

External links 

 
 
 
 
 Lantern slide

1920 films
1920 comedy-drama films
1920 lost films
American black-and-white films
American silent feature films
Films based on American novels
Films directed by Ida May Park
Lost American films
Lost comedy-drama films
1920s American films
Silent American comedy-drama films
1920s English-language films